The Boy Is Mine may refer to:

 "The Boy Is Mine" (song), a 1998 song by Brandy and Monica
 The Boy Is Mine (album), a 1998 album by Monica

See also
 The Girl Is Mine (disambiguation)